Polichna was a town of ancient Ionia, near Erythrae.

Its site is tentatively located near the modern Balıklıova.

References

Populated places in ancient Ionia
Former populated places in Turkey
Urla District
History of İzmir Province